Guru Kashi University (GKU) has been established by the Act of the Legislature of the state of Punjab, under the "Guru Kashi University Act 2011" (Punjab Act No 37 of 2011), to provide education at all levels in all disciplines of higher education
GKU is a residential university with separate hostels for boys and girls housing more than 7000 students. The University provides education through variety of disciplines at all levels of education -doctorate, post graduate, graduate and diploma programmes.

History 

The Guru Kashi University is in Punjab, India. It was founded by the Balaji Education Trust Talwandi Sabo which was established in 1997 that and became the foundation stone for education in this region. The school came into existence in 1998 as GGS Polytechnic College,    graduate and post graduate courses were added,  and in 2001 GGS College of Engineering & Technology was established, followed in 2005 by GGS College of Education, in 2006 by GGS Institute of IT and Research, in 2009 the GGS College of Nursing & GGS Collegiate Public School were established. Finally the university was established in 2011 Guru Kashi University was established by Punjab Act No. 37 of 2011.

Logo 

The LOGO of the University manifests the mission of spreading the knowledge and empowering the youth like the rays of sun illuminate the earth and energize the world. It manifests the resolve for maintaining clean, green and sustainable environment.

Administration 

The Board Of Governors and the Academic Council are the authorities of the University.

The Academic Council is the highest academic body of the University and is responsible for the maintenance of standards of instruction, education and examination within the University.

References

External links
 

Universities in Punjab, India
Education in Bathinda
2011 establishments in Punjab, India
Educational institutions established in 2011